The Expanded Graded Intergenerational Disruption Scale (EGIDS), developed by Lewis and Simons (2010), measures a language's status in terms of endangerment or development. 

The table below shows the various levels on the scale:

The EGIDS model has become widely known, cited in 555 publications as of August 2021.

References

Endangered languages
2010 introductions
2010 in science